The 1874 New Zealand census was a population count taken in 1874. The population of New Zealand was 299,385, not including Māori. The Maori population was estimated to be around 46,000, of whom 43,538 lived in the North Island.  This included part-Māori people living as Māori. Census papers were delivered to households during February 1874, to be completed for the night of 1 March 1874. The census asked questions about people's age, sex, marital status, religion, place of birth, health and education. Additional questions were asked about land use and ownership and about farm animals and equipment.  The census of Māori people was conducted differently to the general census. Instead of delivering papers to each household and later collecting them, officers enquired about the population from reliable local Māori. The reasoning was that Māori had always been used to transmitting their history and pedigrees orally, so more accurate results would be obtained than by means of printed forms. 

The number of Chinese living in New Zealand was shown to have almost doubled from the previous census in 1871, from 2640 to 4796. Only one Chinese woman was said to live in the country.

References

Censuses in New Zealand
1874 in New Zealand
New Zealand